Tana Marie Mongeau (born June 24, 1998) is an American Internet personality. She is known to make "storytime" videos and similar content posted to her YouTube channel.

Early life
Tana Mongeau was born on June 24, 1998, to Rick and Rebecca Mongeau in Las Vegas, Nevada, where she was raised. While on MTV No Filter: Tana Turns 21, Tana said that her parents lacked parenting skills which caused her to have a strained childhood.

Career
Mongeau's most famous videos are her "storytime" videos. On February 10, 2017, Mongeau posted on her Snapchat that she was being investigated by the FBI after someone hacked into her emails and "sent a bombing and shooting threat to McCarran International Airport."

On January 24, 2017, Mongeau posted a video titled "The N Word" which has received over 7 million views. In the video, she describes an encounter where a person on her tour (later revealed to be YouTuber iDubbbz) told her "say nigger", in response to a tweet posted by Mongeau to iDubbbz, telling him to kill himself for his comedic use of the word in his YouTube videos. iDubbbz, in turn, made a video outlining her hypocrisy, pointing out examples where she had previously and publicly used the word in a derogatory manner. On February 17, 2017, Mongeau posted a video in which she apologized for using the word.

Mongeau's debut single, "Hefner", was released in November 2017. The music video featured Bella Thorne. That same month, Mongeau was featured on an episode of Maury. Mongeau collaborated with Lil Phag and Dr. Woke on a song titled "Deadahh" that was released on December 15, 2017. She released her second solo single, "W", on March 1, 2018. Her third solo single, "Fuck Up", was released on August 31, 2018.

Mongeau announced on May 26, 2018, that she would be hosting her own convention, titled TanaCon, at the same time and in the same city as VidCon 2018, from June 22–23. Mongeau intended TanaCon to be an alternative to VidCon after the VidCon 2017 organizers failed to give Mongeau the rights at the convention of a "featured creator". TanaCon took place in Anaheim, California, at the Anaheim Marriott Suites, on June 22, 2018, and was canceled the same day. Over 80 creators were set to hold panels at the event including Bella Thorne, Shane Dawson, Casey Neistat, Miranda Sings, Ricky Dillon, Elijah Daniel, Jenn McAllister, Gabbie Hanna, Trevi Moran, Lisa Schwartz, and Jack Baran. Despite Mongeau's claims that 20,000 people tried to attend the convention, 4,000 to 5,000 people attended at most, and the Marriott was not capable of holding even that many people. Those who attended or lined up to attend complained of lack of food and water and standing for hours in the sun. It was reported that many people were sunburned and that some people passed out because of the heat. The event had received much attention and criticism. The Verge said that fans were comparing it to Fyre Festival, and attendees were yelling "refund" after the event. Dawson said that agreeing to appear at TanaCon was the "worst decision [he] ever made." Mongeau later apologized and said that refunds would be issued. Dawson later released a three-part documentary style series of YouTube videos that shared Mongeau and other people involved in the convention's perspectives on the event. TanaCon was organized in collaboration with actor and producer Michael Weist.

It was announced on April 29, 2019, that Mongeau will be starring on her own MTV reality series titled MTV No Filter: Tana Turns 21 premiering Summer 2019. Mongeau's fourth solo single, "FaceTime", was released on May 18, 2019, alongside its music video. In May 2019, VidCon said that Mongeau would be a featured creator at the convention. VidCon cofounder Hank Green had said in 2018 that he had "100% screwed up" in not inviting Mongeau to VidCon 2017 as a featured creator.

On January 26, 2022, Mongeau launched her own wine brand Dizzy Wine.

Personal life
Mongeau is openly bisexual. At the start of her YouTube career, Mongeau was in a relationship with Somer Hollingsworth and he was featured in many of her vlogs before the couple broke up in June 2017. Mongeau was in a relationship with Bella Thorne from the summer of 2017 to February 2019, including a period in which she, Thorne, and singer Mod Sun were a throuple. She has also had on-and-off relationships with rappers Lil Xan and Chris Miles, and the two artists have revealed that their collaborative single "Miss Me" was inspired by their relationships with Mongeau.

Mongeau began dating social media personality Jake Paul in April 2019. In June 2019, the couple announced that they were engaged, although many fans and commentators did not believe that the engagement was legitimate. On July 28 of that year, Paul and Mongeau exchanged vows in Las Vegas. InTouch later reported that the couple had not obtained a marriage license prior to the ceremony and that the officiant was also not licensed by the state of Nevada. As a result, the marriage was not legally binding. BuzzFeed reported that Paul and Mongeau left the ceremony separately. The ceremony, which was available on pay-per-view for $50, was recorded for MTV No Filter: Tana Turns 21. On an episode of the show, Mongeau stated that the ceremony was something "fun and lighthearted that we're obviously doing for fun and for content." The couple announced their breakup in January 2020.

Discography

Singles

As lead artist

As featured artist

Guest appearances

Filmography

Awards and nominations

Notes

References

External links
 
 
 

1998 births
Living people
People from Las Vegas
YouTube channels launched in 2015
American YouTubers
Streamy Award winners
LGBT people from Nevada
LGBT YouTubers
YouTube controversies
Bisexual musicians
American LGBT musicians
20th-century LGBT people
21st-century LGBT people